Marriage is the thirteenth studio album by Japanese Pop band Deen. It was released on 8 August 2012 under Ariola Japan.

Background
The album consists of only one previously released single, Kokoro kara Kimi ga Suki ~Marriage~. This single, its coupling song, Ame ga Itsuka Agaruyouni and from Brand New Wings's coupling spmg Flower had received new arrangement under title Album mix.

In this album they collaborated with the famous Japanese novelist Shin Kibayashi who wrote for them lyrics (along with help of Shuuichi Ikeda) for four songs out of ten.

This album was released in two formats: regular CD edition and limited CD+DVD edition. The limited edition includes DVD footage of their live performance  Deen Live Joy -Break16- ~Graduation Party~.

After finishing recording of this album, they moved to the new music label Epic Records Japan.

Charting performance
The album reached #23 in its first week and charted for 3 weeks, selling 5,000+ copies.

Track listing

References

Sony Music albums
Japanese-language albums
2012 albums
Deen (band) albums